City Sports Club Dnipro Cherkasy is a Ukrainian football team based in Cherkasy. Over its history the club has been dissolved and revived several times. The original club that existed 1955-1974 was dissolved following a financial scandal. After that the club again was dissolved and revived couple of more times.

In the fall of 2018 the administration of Cherkasy Tsentralny Stadion revived the club as MSC Dnipro Cherkasy.

Team names
 1955–1974: first club (18 seasons)
 1955–1956: FC Dynamo/Burevisnyk Cherkasy
 1956–1966: FC Kolhospnyk Cherkasy
 1967–1972: FC Dnipro Cherkasy
 1973–1974: FC Hranyt Cherkasy
 1975–2002: second club (26 seasons)
 1975–1997: FC Dnipro Cherkasy
 1997–2002: FC Cherkasy
 2003–2009: third club (5 seasons)
 2003–2004: FC Cherkasy
 2004–2009: FC Dnipro Cherkasy
 2018–present: fourth club
 2018–present: FC Dnipro Cherkasy

History overview
The Cherkasy city football club traces its heritage to 1947 when Cherkasy FC (ChFC) represented the city at the republican football competitions (as part of Kyiv Oblast). Next year the city was represented by an army team Dom Ofitserov (DO). Upon creation of the Cherkasy Oblast in 1954, the city of Cherkasy was represented in republican competitions by Torpedo.

In 1955, the city was represented in republican competitions by local branch of Dynamo sports society, but in mid-season was replaced with another team that was a member of Burevisnyk sports society. Burevisnyk is considered to be a direct predecessor of the latter FC Dnipro. The club was established on 9 May 1955, the 10th anniversary Victory Day. The original team kept its professional status for 44 years since acquiring it in 1958 and reacquired it in 2003 after the short term disruption for the 2002/03 season. Over its history Dnipro has already many times revived and dissolved. As a "team of masters" Kolhospnyk (predecessor of Kolos sports society), the club was admitted to the Soviet Class B competitions in 1958. In 1960 football competitions in Class B were organized and Ukrainian clubs as "teams of masters" played in its own republican tournament known as Class B of the Ukrainian SSR.

In December 1957 after series of friendlies, the football team Kolhospnyk Cherkasy was included in national competitions among teams of Class B. Such an unprecedented decision about inclusion of the Cherkasian football club in championship was connected with construction of the stadium, stands of which contained 27 sectors and capacity of 15,000 spectators. Already in 1959 Kolhospnyk inscribed in its history its first feat when it became a winner of the IV International games among rural teams of socialist countries that took place in Bulgaria.

In 1967 the main Cherkasy team switched its name to Dnipro after the river on the banks of which the city of Cherkasy sits. Following another reorganization of the Soviet football competitions in 1970, republican Class B competitions were phased away and the Soviet Class A was expanded to three divisions. Many teams of former Ukrainian Class B were admitted to the Soviet Class A Second Group that next year in 1971 it was renamed in the Soviet Second League. Among those teams was Dnipro. However, in 1972 Dnipro was relegated to amateurs (republican competitions) where it was renamed to Hranyt and coached by former Dynamo player Vitaliy Khmelnytskyi in two seasons returned to the Second League. Yet it did not stay there too long as the club in 1974 appeared in a middle of a corruption scandal. This corruption case reached to be dealt at a level of the Central Committee of the Communist Party of Ukraine and feuilleton at the Muscovite newspaper "Pravda" under an eloquent title "Gild the leg".

The club was expelled from the PFL in the second half of the 2008–09 season due to failing to arrive to a scheduled fixture for the second time.

Stadium

History of the club is closely entwined with history of central stadium in Cherkasy. Before 1957 in Cherkasy existed 10 stadiums with football fields the bigger being "Kharchovyk" (5,000), "Avanhard/Trud" (2,500), "Vodnyk" (1,500). Before the World War II on territory of Ukraine, all important football games in Cherkasy used to take place at Kharchovyk ("Food-provider") Stadium, however due to combat actions the stadium of Cherkasy Refined Sugar Factory was destroyed. Following the war and until early 1950s, the main city stadium became Vodnyk. In 1952 after debut of the Soviet Olympic team at the Olympics in Helsinki, the Communist Party of the Soviet Union made emphasis on mass involvement in sports. The archive documents show that on 15 September 1955 there were allocated  to local sports society "Kolhospnyk" in connection of building a local central stadium in place of Vodnyk and in two years the city authorities majestically opened a fine football arena of VSS "Kolhospnyk" with capacity of 15,000 spectators. On 9 November 1957 the new stadium hosted a first exhibition game between Dinamo (from Kyiv) and local Kolhospnyk.

Colours

Traditionally the club colours are white, red and blue.

Honors

Ukrainian Druha Liha
Winners (2): 1992–93, 2005–06 Group B
Ukrainian football championship among amateurs
Winners (2): 1973, 1987
Cherkasy Oblast Football Championship
Winners (2): 1956, 1957

Players

League and cup history

Soviet Union
{|class="wikitable"
|-bgcolor="#efefef"
! Season
! Div.
! Pos.
! Pl.
! W
! D
! L
! GS
! GA
! P
!Domestic Cup
!colspan=2|Other
!Notes
|-
|align=center colspan=14|FC Torpedo Cherkasy
|-
|align=center|1954
|align=center|4th
|align=center|6
|align=center|10
|align=center|1
|align=center|1
|align=center|8
|align=center|6
|align=center|35
|align=center|3
|align=center|
|align=center|
|align=center|
|align=center|
|-
|align=center colspan=14|FC Burevisnyk Cherkasy
|-
|align=center|1955
|align=center|4th
|align=center|8
|align=center|14
|align=center|0
|align=center|5
|align=center|9
|align=center|12
|align=center|43
|align=center|5
|align=center|
|align=center|
|align=center|
|align=center|
|-
|align=center|1956
|align=center|4th
|align=center bgcolor=silver|2
|align=center|14
|align=center|10
|align=center|1
|align=center|3
|align=center|24
|align=center|13
|align=center|21
|align=center|
|align=center|
|align=center|
|align=center|
|-
|align=center colspan=14|FC Kolhospnyk Cherkasy
|-
|align=center|1957
|align=center|4th
|align=center bgcolor=silver|2
|align=center|10
|align=center|2
|align=center|6
|align=center|2
|align=center|17
|align=center|14
|align=center|10
|align=center|
|align=center|
|align=center|
|align=center bgcolor=lightgreen|Promoted
|-
|align=center|1958
|align=center|2nd
|align=center|13
|align=center|30
|align=center|5
|align=center|11
|align=center|14
|align=center|22
|align=center|35
|align=center|21
|align=center|
|align=center|
|align=center|
|align=center|
|-
|align=center|1959
|align=center|2nd
|align=center|4
|align=center|28
|align=center|14
|align=center|8
|align=center|6
|align=center|36
|align=center|24
|align=center|36
|align=center|
|align=center|
|align=center|
|align=center|
|-
|align=center|1960
|align=center|2nd
|align=center|12
|align=center|32
|align=center|8
|align=center|10
|align=center|14
|align=center|31
|align=center|46
|align=center|26
|align=center|
|align=center|
|align=center|
|align=center|
|-
|align=center|1961
|align=center|2nd
|align=center|16
|align=center|34
|align=center|9
|align=center|10
|align=center|15
|align=center|25
|align=center|47
|align=center|28
|align=center|
|align=center|
|align=center|
|align=center|
|-
|align=center rowspan=2|1962
|align=center rowspan=2|2nd
|align=center|6
|align=center|24
|align=center|8
|align=center|12
|align=center|4
|align=center|27
|align=center|21
|align=center|28
|align=center rowspan=2|
|align=center rowspan=2|
|align=center rowspan=2|
|align=center|to finals
|-
|align=center|8
|align=center|10
|align=center|5
|align=center|3
|align=center|2
|align=center|19
|align=center|13
|align=center|13
|align=center bgcolor=pink|Relegated
|-
|align=center rowspan=2|1963
|align=center rowspan=2|3rd
|align=center|6
|align=center|38
|align=center|19
|align=center|8
|align=center|11
|align=center|50
|align=center|35
|align=center|46
|align=center rowspan=2|
|align=center rowspan=2|
|align=center rowspan=2|
|align=center|to finals
|-
|align=center|12
|align=center|2
|align=center|1
|align=center|0
|align=center|1
|align=center|2
|align=center|3
|align=center|2
|align=center|
|-
|align=center rowspan=2|1964
|align=center rowspan=2|3rd
|align=center|5
|align=center|30
|align=center|11
|align=center|12
|align=center|7
|align=center|32
|align=center|24
|align=center|34
|align=center rowspan=2|
|align=center rowspan=2|
|align=center rowspan=2|
|align=center|to finals
|-
|align=center|15
|align=center|10
|align=center|4
|align=center|3
|align=center|3
|align=center|8
|align=center|6
|align=center|11
|align=center|
|-
|align=center rowspan=2|1965
|align=center rowspan=2|3rd
|align=center|8
|align=center|30
|align=center|10
|align=center|10
|align=center|10
|align=center|30
|align=center|30
|align=center|30
|align=center rowspan=2|
|align=center rowspan=2|
|align=center rowspan=2|
|align=center|to finals
|-
|align=center|19
|align=center|10
|align=center|7
|align=center|2
|align=center|1
|align=center|14
|align=center|8
|align=center|16
|align=center|
|-
|align=center rowspan=2|1966
|align=center rowspan=2|3rd
|align=center|12
|align=center|38
|align=center|11
|align=center|14
|align=center|13
|align=center|24
|align=center|31
|align=center|36
|align=center rowspan=2|
|align=center rowspan=2|
|align=center rowspan=2|
|align=center|to finals
|-
|align=center|23
|align=center colspan=7|withdrew
|align=center|
|-
|align=center colspan=14|FC Dnipro Cherkasy
|-
|align=center rowspan=2|1967
|align=center rowspan=2|3rd
|align=center bgcolor=silver|2
|align=center|40
|align=center|19
|align=center|12
|align=center|9
|align=center|46
|align=center|22
|align=center|50
|align=center rowspan=2|
|align=center rowspan=2|
|align=center rowspan=2|
|align=center|to finals
|-
|align=center|6
|align=center|5
|align=center|1
|align=center|0
|align=center|4
|align=center|4
|align=center|10
|align=center|2
|align=center|
|-
|align=center|1968
|align=center|3rd
|align=center|16
|align=center|40
|align=center|10
|align=center|15
|align=center|15
|align=center|33
|align=center|41
|align=center|35
|align=center|
|align=center|
|align=center|
|align=center|
|-
|align=center|1969
|align=center|3rd
|align=center|19
|align=center|40
|align=center|8
|align=center|13
|align=center|19
|align=center|21
|align=center|36
|align=center|29
|align=center|
|align=center|
|align=center|
|align=center|
|-
|align=center|1970
|align=center|3rd
|align=center|15
|align=center|40
|align=center|15
|align=center|14
|align=center|11
|align=center|49
|align=center|42
|align=center|44
|align=center|
|align=center|
|align=center|
|align=center|
|-
|align=center|1971
|align=center|3rd
|align=center|24
|align=center|50
|align=center|9
|align=center|15
|align=center|26
|align=center|28
|align=center|69
|align=center|33
|align=center|
|align=center|
|align=center|
|align=center bgcolor=pink|Relegated
|-
|align=center|1972
|align=center|4th
|align=center|6
|align=center|14
|align=center|4
|align=center|3
|align=center|7
|align=center|9
|align=center|15
|align=center|11
|align=center|
|align=center|
|align=center|
|align=center|
|-
|align=center colspan=14|FC Hranyt Cherkasy
|-
|align=center rowspan=2|1973
|align=center rowspan=2|4th
|align=center bgcolor=gold|1
|align=center|14
|align=center|11
|align=center|2
|align=center|1
|align=center|27
|align=center|7
|align=center|24
|align=center rowspan=2|
|align=center rowspan=2|
|align=center rowspan=2|
|align=center|to finals
|-
|align=center bgcolor=gold|1
|align=center|4
|align=center|3
|align=center|1
|align=center|0
|align=center|8
|align=center|3
|align=center|7
|align=center bgcolor=lightgreen|Promoted
|-
|align=center|1974
|align=center|3rd
|align=center|16
|align=center|38
|align=center|9
|align=center|10
|align=center|13
|align=center|32
|align=center|49
|align=center|34
|align=center|
|align=center|
|align=center|
|align=center bgcolor=lightgrey|Expelled
|-
|align=center colspan=14|FC Dnipro Cherkasy
|-
|align=center|1975
|align=center|4th
|align=center|7
|align=center|12
|align=center|0
|align=center|2
|align=center|10
|align=center|9
|align=center|25
|align=center|2
|align=center|
|align=center|
|align=center|
|align=center|
|-
|align=center|1976
|align=center|4th
|align=center|9
|align=center|20
|align=center|4
|align=center|4
|align=center|12
|align=center|20
|align=center|37
|align=center|12
|align=center|
|align=center|
|align=center|
|align=center bgcolor=lightgreen|Promoted
|-
|align=center|1977
|align=center|3rd
|align=center|23
|align=center|44
|align=center|8
|align=center|10
|align=center|26
|align=center|26
|align=center|69
|align=center|26
|align=center|
|align=center|
|align=center|
|align=center|
|-
|align=center|1978
|align=center|3rd
|align=center|18
|align=center|44
|align=center|11
|align=center|12
|align=center|21
|align=center|29
|align=center|53
|align=center|34
|align=center|
|align=center|
|align=center|
|align=center|
|-
|align=center|1979
|align=center|3rd
|align=center|14
|align=center|46
|align=center|14
|align=center|13
|align=center|19
|align=center|38
|align=center|49
|align=center|41
|align=center|
|align=center|
|align=center|
|align=center|
|-
|align=center|1980
|align=center|3rd
|align=center|17
|align=center|44
|align=center|13
|align=center|9
|align=center|22
|align=center|43
|align=center|50
|align=center|35
|align=center|
|align=center|
|align=center|
|align=center|
|-
|align=center|1981
|align=center|3rd
|align=center|20
|align=center|44
|align=center|13
|align=center|11
|align=center|20
|align=center|44
|align=center|55
|align=center|37
|align=center|
|align=center|
|align=center|
|align=center|
|-
|align=center|1982
|align=center|3rd
|align=center|8
|align=center|46
|align=center|21
|align=center|12
|align=center|13
|align=center|54
|align=center|42
|align=center|54
|align=center|
|align=center|
|align=center|
|align=center|
|-
|align=center|1983
|align=center|3rd
|align=center|25
|align=center|50
|align=center|13
|align=center|13
|align=center|24
|align=center|35
|align=center|61
|align=center|39
|align=center|
|align=center|
|align=center|
|align=center|
|-
|align=center|1984
|align=center|3rd
|align=center|26
|align=center|38
|align=center|3
|align=center|9
|align=center|26
|align=center|11
|align=center|55
|align=center|15
|align=center|
|align=center|
|align=center|
|align=center bgcolor=pink|Relegated
|-
|align=center|1985
|align=center|4th
|align=center|5
|align=center|14
|align=center|3
|align=center|5
|align=center|6
|align=center|11
|align=center|29
|align=center|11
|align=center|
|align=center|
|align=center|
|align=center|
|-
|align=center|1986
|align=center|4th
|align=center|8
|align=center|16
|align=center|3
|align=center|3
|align=center|10
|align=center|14
|align=center|30
|align=center|9
|align=center|
|align=center|
|align=center|
|align=center|
|-
|align=center rowspan=2|1987
|align=center rowspan=2|4th
|align=center bgcolor=gold|1
|align=center|16
|align=center|12
|align=center|1
|align=center|3
|align=center|35
|align=center|10
|align=center|25
|align=center rowspan=2|
|align=center rowspan=2|
|align=center rowspan=2|
|align=center|to finals
|-
|align=center bgcolor=gold|1
|align=center|5
|align=center|4
|align=center|1
|align=center|0
|align=center|10
|align=center|2
|align=center|9
|align=center bgcolor=lightgreen|Promoted
|-
|align=center|1988
|align=center|3rd
|align=center|22
|align=center|50
|align=center|16
|align=center|9
|align=center|25
|align=center|57
|align=center|77
|align=center|41
|align=center|
|align=center|
|align=center|
|align=center|
|-
|align=center|1989
|align=center|3rd
|align=center|17
|align=center|52
|align=center|15
|align=center|16
|align=center|21
|align=center|64
|align=center|79
|align=center|46
|align=center|
|align=center|
|align=center|
|align=center bgcolor=pink|Relegated
|-
|align=center|1990
|align=center|3rd 
|align=center|16
|align=center|36
|align=center|8
|align=center|7
|align=center|21
|align=center|26
|align=center|48
|align=center|23
|align=center|
|align=center|
|align=center|
|align=center|
|-
|align=center|1991
|align=center|3rd 
|align=center|18
|align=center|50
|align=center|17
|align=center|10
|align=center|23
|align=center|47
|align=center|59
|align=center|44
|align=center|
|align=center|
|align=center|
|align=center|
|-
|}

Ukraine
Dnipro joined the Ukrainian competitions upon finishing the 1991 Soviet Lower Second League, Zone 1 season.
{|class="wikitable"
|-bgcolor="#efefef"
! Season
! Div.
! Pos.
! Pl.
! W
! D
! L
! GS
! GA
! P
!Domestic Cup
!colspan=2|Europe
!Notes
|-
|align=center colspan=14|FC Dnipro Cherkasy
|-
|align=center|1992
|align=center|2nd "A"
|align=center|12
|align=center|26
|align=center|9
|align=center|4
|align=center|13
|align=center|22
|align=center|27
|align=center|22
|align=center|1/32 finals
|align=center|
|align=center|
|align=center bgcolor=pink|Relegated
|-
|align=center|1992–93
|align=center|3rd
|align=center bgcolor=gold|1
|align=center|34
|align=center|20
|align=center|9
|align=center|5
|align=center|59
|align=center|33
|align=center|49
|align=center|1/64 finals
|align=center|
|align=center|
|align=center bgcolor=lightgreen|Promoted
|-
|align=center|1993–94
|align=center|2nd
|align=center|5
|align=center|38
|align=center|19
|align=center|7
|align=center|12
|align=center|56
|align=center|39
|align=center|45
|align=center|1/32 finals
|align=center|
|align=center|
|align=center|
|-
|align=center|1994–95
|align=center|2nd
|align=center|20
|align=center|42
|align=center|11
|align=center|8
|align=center|23
|align=center|33
|align=center|48
|align=center|41
|align=center|1/64 finals
|align=center|
|align=center|
|align=center|
|-
|align=center|1995–96
|align=center|2nd
|align=center|20
|align=center|42
|align=center|6
|align=center|4
|align=center|32
|align=center|26
|align=center|91
|align=center|22
|align=center|1/32 finals
|align=center|
|align=center|
|align=center|
|-
|align=center|1996–97
|align=center|2nd
|align=center|17
|align=center|46
|align=center|16
|align=center|7
|align=center|23
|align=center|46
|align=center|78
|align=center|55
|align=center|1/64 finals
|align=center|
|align=center|
|align=center|
|-
|align=center colspan=14|FC Cherkasy
|-
|align=center|1997–98
|align=center|2nd
|align=center|7
|align=center|42
|align=center|19
|align=center|11
|align=center|12
|align=center|51
|align=center|41
|align=center|68
|align=center|1/64 finals
|align=center|
|align=center|
|align=center|
|-
|align=center|1998–99
|align=center|2nd
|align=center|4
|align=center|38
|align=center|24
|align=center|4
|align=center|10
|align=center|68
|align=center|42
|align=center|76
|align=center|1/16 finals
|align=center|
|align=center|
|align=center|
|-
|align=center|1999–00
|align=center|2nd
|align=center bgcolor=tan|3
|align=center|34
|align=center|17
|align=center|8
|align=center|9
|align=center|48
|align=center|34
|align=center|39
|align=center|1/16 finals
|align=center|
|align=center|
|align=center|
|-
|align=center|2000–01
|align=center|2nd
|align=center|16
|align=center|34
|align=center|19
|align=center|7
|align=center|18
|align=center|35
|align=center|5'
|align=center|34
|align=center|1/16 finals
|align=center|
|align=center|
|align=center bgcolor=pink|Relegated
|-
|align=center|2001–02
|align=center|3rd "B"
|align=center|11
|align=center|34
|align=center|13
|align=center|7
|align=center|14
|align=center|49
|align=center|36
|align=center|16
|align=center|1/32 finals
|align=center|
|align=center|
|align=center bgcolor=lightgrey|dissolved
|-
|align=center colspan=14|revived as FC Cherkasy
|-
|align=center|2003
|align=center|4th
|align=center|2
|align=center|8
|align=center|6
|align=center|1
|align=center|1
|align=center|17
|align=center|6
|align=center|19
|align=center|
|align=center|
|align=center|
|align=center|
|-
|align=center|2003–04
|align=center|3rd "C"
|align=center|8
|align=center|30
|align=center|11
|align=center|7
|align=center|12
|align=center|40
|align=center|40
|align=center|40
|align=center|1/32 finals
|align=center|
|align=center|
|align=center|
|-
|align=center colspan=14|FC Dnipro Cherkasy
|-
|align=center|2004–05
|align=center|3rd "B"
|align=center bgcolor=Tan|3
|align=center|28
|align=center|20
|align=center|5
|align=center|3
|align=center|48
|align=center|15
|align=center|65
|align=center|1/8 finals
|align=center|
|align=center|
|align=center|
|-
|align=center|2005–06
|align=center|3rd "B"
|align=center bgcolor=gold|1
|align=center|24
|align=center|18
|align=center|3
|align=center|3
|align=center|49
|align=center|22
|align=center|57
|align=center|1/16 finals
|align=center|
|align=center|
|align=center bgcolor=lightgreen|Promoted
|-
|align=center|2006–07
|align=center|2nd
|align=center|15
|align=center|36
|align=center|10
|align=center|9
|align=center|17
|align=center|31
|align=center|46
|align=center|39
|align=center|1/16 finals
|align=center|
|align=center|
|align=center|
|-
|align=center|2007–08
|align=center|2nd
|align=center|18
|align=center|38
|align=center|8
|align=center|17
|align=center|13
|align=center|43
|align=center|43
|align=center|35
|align=center|1/32 finals
|align=center|
|align=center|
|align=center bgcolor=pink|Relegated
|-
|align=center|2008–09
|align=center|3rd "A"
|align=center|7
|align=center|32
|align=center|17
|align=center|5
|align=center|10
|align=center|37
|align=center|20
|align=center|50
|align=center|1/64 finals
|align=center|
|align=center|
|align=center bgcolor=lightgrey|Expelled
|-
|align=center colspan=14|revived as FC Slavutych Cherkasy
|-
|}

Head coaches

Head coaches
Ihor Kolomoyets
Albert Zalyalutdinov

Notes

References

See also
 FC Cherkaskyi Dnipro – formation of new club in 2010 which entered the professional ranks in 2011 and has historically tied itself to this former club.

External links
 Official team website
 Fans' website

 
Ukrainian Second League clubs
Football clubs in Cherkasy
Association football clubs established in 1955
1955 establishments in Ukraine
Kolos (sports society)
Agrarian association football clubs in Ukraine